Fort Pikit is a historic fortification in Pikit, Cotabato, Philippines.

Background
Fort Pikit is a Spanish colonial era stone fortification. in Pikit, Cotabato. The fortification consists of two towers installed with artillery batteries and a rubble wall which measures  a side. It was intended to house a military officer, 60 infantrymen and 6 artillerymen by its Spanish builders.

Fort Pikit is part of the town's barangay of the same name which is one of the 63 barangays in Cotabato province which are part of the Bangsamoro region rather than Soccsksargen, the region where Pikit and Cotabato province the parent municipality and province of Pikit town is a part of. 

It is situated at the back of the Pikit Municipal Hall on a hill facing the National Highway.

History
Fort Pikit was built in 1893 by the Spanish at the time the Spanish colonial government was actively launching a campaign against the Moro in Mindanao. When the United States took over the administration of the Philippines from Spain, the American colonial government gained control of the fort in 1902 and used it their own campaign in Mindanao. Still within the American colonial period, the Philippine Constabulary assumed control of the fort. During the Japanese occupation of the Philippines of World War II the fort was seized by Imperial Japanese forces. The Allied forces regained control of the fort as part of their Eastern Mindanao campaign.

After the war, the fort was used by the Philippine Army and later the Philippine Marines. The marines vacated the fort in 2007.

The fortification was declared as a national landmark, the first in Cotabato province in 2012.

Heritage designation
The National Historical Commission of the Philippines (NHCP) has designated Fort Pikit as a National Historical Landmark. It gave the site the designation in 2012. Under the administration of Governor Emmylou Talino-Mendoza, the provincial government of Cotabato worked for at least a year with the municipal government of Pikit under Mayor Sumulong Sultan for the designation. The NHCP sent a team to Fort Pikit on March 12, 2012 to conduct validation, investigation of historical facts related to the fortification. The agency declared Fort Pikit as national historical landmark two months later on April 24, 2012.

See also
Philippines National Historical Landmarks

References

Buildings and structures in Cotabato
Spanish Colonial Fortifications of the Philippines
Army installations of the Philippines
Geography of Bangsamoro